"I Can't Let Go" is a song co-written by Al Gorgoni and Chip Taylor, who also wrote "Wild Thing". "I Can't Let Go" was originally recorded by blue-eyed soul singer Evie Sands' on George Goldner's Blue Cat label, which was popular in New York City in 1965. The song became popular in 1966 for the group the Hollies, who charted at number two in the UK Singles Chart with their version. Linda Ronstadt covered the song in 1980 and had a number 31 hit on the US Billboard Hot 100 chart.

The Hollies version

Background
"I Can't Let Go" is the Hollies' first 1966 single, and their last with original bassist Eric Haydock. It peaked at number two in the UK and number 42 on the Billboard Hot 100 in the US. It is ranked as the 37th biggest British hit of 1966.  The Hollies' version was praised by Paul McCartney, who thought Graham Nash's soaring tenor in the chorus was a trumpet.  Billboard described the song as a "pulsating number with driving dance beat." After "I Can't Let Go" was recorded Haydock was replaced by Bernie Calvert, who played on the band's next single ("Bus Stop").

Chart performance

Linda Ronstadt version

Background
Linda Ronstadt released the most successful American version in 1980 from her platinum-certified album, Mad Love. Released as the disc's third single, it was produced by Peter Asher and was issued on Asylum Records. Ronstadt's cover of "I Can't Let Go" reached number 27 on the Cash Box Top 100 and number 31 on the Billboard Hot 100 chart in the summer of 1980.

Chart performance

Other versions
The Dickies included this song (under the name "Can't Let Go") on their 1998 all-covers album, Dogs from the Hare That Bit Us. 
Les Fradkin covered the song on his 2006 album, Goin' Back.
Canadian rock band Sloan covered this song on their ersatz-live album, Recorded Live at a Sloan Party.

References

1965 songs
1966 singles
1980 singles
The Hollies songs
Linda Ronstadt songs
Parlophone singles
Songs written by Chip Taylor
Songs written by Al Gorgoni
Imperial Records singles
Asylum Records singles